Luke Oldknow (born 3 January 2001) is a Zimbabwean cricketer. He made his first-class debut on 3 March 2020, for Mashonaland Eagles in the 2019–20 Logan Cup.

References

External links
 

2001 births
Living people
Zimbabwean cricketers
Mashonaland Eagles cricketers
Place of birth missing (living people)